Mord Em'ly is a 1922 British silent drama film directed by George Pearson and starring Betty Balfour, Rex Davis and Elsie Craven. It was based on the 1898 novel of the same title by William Pett Ridge.

Cast

 Betty Balfour as Maud Emily  
 Rex Davis as Barden  
 Elsie Craven as Gilliken  
 Edward Sorley as Father  
 Mrs. Hubert Willis as Mother

References

Bibliography
 Low, Rachael. The History of the British Film 1918-1929. George Allen & Unwin, 1971.

External links
 

1922 films
1922 drama films
British drama films
British silent feature films
1920s English-language films
Films directed by George Pearson
Films set in England
Films based on British novels
British black-and-white films
1920s British films
Silent drama films